Parliamentary elections were held in Romania on 7 March 1965. Voters were presented with a single list from the People's Democratic Front, which was dominated by the Romanian Workers Party. The Front won 465 seats in the Great National Assembly.

Electoral system
Candidates were elected in single member constituencies, and had to receive over 50% of the vote. If no candidate passed this threshold, or if voter turnout in the constituency was less than 50%, re-runs were held until the requirements were met. Candidates could be nominated by the People's Democratic Front or mass organisations, although the latter were monitored by the Front. Voters had the option of voting against the Front candidates.

Results

References

Parliamentary elections in Romania
Romania
1965 in Romania
One-party elections
March 1965 events in Europe
1965 elections in Romania